Carlos del Cerro Grande (born 13 March 1976) is a Spanish referee.
He has been an international referee since 2013, with his debut coming in an international match on 26 May 2013, between the under-19 teams of Scotland and Georgia.

On 15 June 2021, Del Cerro refereed in a major international finals match for the first time. He officiated the group match of Euro 2020 between France and Germany. He faced criticism for not calling a foul against Germany in their penalty area.

Awards

Second Division Gold Whistle: 2010
Vicente Acebedo Trophy: 2016

See also
List of football referees

References

External links
 

1976 births
Living people
People from Alcalá de Henares
Sportspeople from the Community of Madrid
Spanish football referees
Sportspeople from Madrid
UEFA Euro 2020 referees